Imperiali may refer to
Imperiali quota
Imperiali family